Cumia bednalli is a species of sea snail, a marine gastropod mollusk in the family Colubrariidae.

Description
The shell size is 20 mm

Distribution
This species is distributed around the southern Australian coast from South Queensland to Western Australia.

References

External links
 Gastropods.com : Triton (Epidromus) bednalli bednalli; accessed : 26 November 2010

Colubrariidae
Gastropods described in 1875